The Gospel of Eve is an almost entirely lost text from the New Testament apocrypha, which may be the same as the also lost Gospel of Perfection.

The only known content from it are a few quotations by Epiphanius (Panarion, 26), a church father who criticised how the Borborites used it to justify free love, by practicing coitus interruptus and eating semen as a religious act. While certain libertine Gnostics held that, since the flesh is intrinsically evil, one should simply acknowledge it by freely engaging in sexual acts, the majority of the Gnostics took the opposite view of extreme asceticism.

Text
Gnostics typically wrote on multiple levels, imbuing texts with complicated mystical esoteric meaning, rather than intending a base interpretation. It is possible that Epiphanius failed to realise this and only read into the text a simple literal interpretation. The quotation Epiphanius claims as a reference to semen is:

While this second passage from their "apocryphal writings," says Epiphanius, was meant to represent the menstrual cycle (it is unclear if he is quoting ):

Interpretation
According to the Naassenes, this reflected the "Seeds disseminated into the cosmos from the Inexpressible [Man], by means of which the whole cosmos is consummated." The scattering of the Logos and its subsequent collection recalls the myths of Osiris and Dionysus. A similar theme of Osirification is present in a Gospel of Philip, quoted by Epiphanius in the same chapter:

See also
List of Gospels

References

Eve